Natanael Moreira Milouski (born 5 January 2002), simply known as Natanael, is a Brazilian footballer who plays as a right back for Coritiba.

Club career
Born in Braganey, Paraná, Natanael joined Coritiba's youth setup in 2016, for the under-14 team. He made his first team debut on 2 February 2020, starting in a 3–2 Campeonato Paranaense away win over Londrina.

On 24 July 2020, Natanael renewed his contract until December 2023. He made his Série A debut on 12 August, starting in a 0–1 loss at Bahia.

Natanael scored his first professional goal on 20 January 2021, netting his team's second in a 3–3 home draw against Fluminense. On 11 February, despite the club's relegation, he further extended his link until the end of 2025.

Despite starting the 2021 campaign as a first-choice, Natanael became a backup to Igor during the 2021 Paranaense. He regained his starting spot in the 2021 Série B, being an important unit as the club achieved promotion back to the top tier.

Career statistics

Notes

References

2002 births
Living people
Sportspeople from Paraná (state)
Brazilian footballers
Association football defenders
Campeonato Brasileiro Série A players
Campeonato Brasileiro Série B players
Coritiba Foot Ball Club players